SMS Greif was a German cargo steamship that was converted into a merchant raider for the Imperial German Navy.

Built as Guben, she was a  steel-hulled ship owned by the German-Australian Line (DADG), Hamburg. She was converted for naval service at Kaiserliche Werft Kiel in 1915 and commissioned as Greif on 23 January 1916. She sailed from the Elbe port of Cuxhaven on 27 February 1916 under the command of Fregattenkapitän Rudolf Tietze (born 13 September 1874). The Royal Navy had learned of Greifs sailing and was waiting in the North Sea.

Greif was disguised as the Norwegian Rena bound for Tønsberg, Norway when intercepted by the  armed merchant cruiser  on the morning of 29 February 1916. Alcantara closed to 2000 yards and slowed to lower a boarding cutter when Greif hoisted the German battle ensign, increased speed, and opened fire. Alcantara returned fire with her six  guns and two 3-pounders. Range was never more than 3000 yards.

Alcantara was hit by a torpedo amidships on her port side, and one of Alcantaras shells exploded the ready ammunition for Greifs after gun. Both ships lost speed. Greifs crew abandoned ship 40 minutes after opening fire. Alcantara sank first. The C-class light cruiser  and M-class destroyer  then arrived to sink the stationary Greif and rescue 120 German survivors. An estimated 187 Germans perished along with 72 Britons.

See also
 Action of 29 February 1916

Notes

References

External links
 

1914 ships
Auxiliary cruisers of the Imperial German Navy
Maritime incidents in 1916
World War I commerce raiders
World War I cruisers of Germany
World War I shipwrecks in the North Sea
Naval magazine explosions